is a town located in Kamimashiki District, Kumamoto Prefecture, Japan.

As of October 2016, the town has an estimated population of 16,901 and a density of 170 persons per km². The total area is 99.00 km².

Mifune Town is well known for being home to Costco Kumamoto.

Education

Universities 
Heisei College of Music

Archaeology 
In March 2014, a piece of sandstone was found in Mifune that was revealed to contain a tooth dated to the Late Cretaceous, 90 million years ago. The tooth is the oldest thus found in Japan and is assumed to be a back tooth from the left, upper jaw of a carnivore similar to a Deltatheridium, an ancient marsupial relative that lived in what is now Mongolia between 145 and 66 million years ago. The find was announced by the Mifune Dinosaur Museum in August 2017. The museum and town also partner with Montana State University's Museum of the Rockies.

References

External links 

Mifune official website (some content in English)

Towns in Kumamoto Prefecture